The Regius Professorship of Moral and Pastoral Theology, together with the Regius Professorship of Ecclesiastical History, was founded at the University of Oxford by act of Parliament in 1840, and first filled in 1842. The act attached the chair to the fourth canonry at Christ Church from the next vacancy, which occurred in 1849. The initial title,  Regius Professor of Pastoral Theology, was expanded for the appointment of K. E. Kirk in 1933. The professor is a member of the Chapter of Christ Church.

List of Regius Professors
1842–1873: Charles Atmore Ogilvie
1873–1885: Edward King
1885–1892: Francis Paget
1892–1903: Robert Campbell Moberly
1903–1933: Robert Lawrence Ottley
1933–1938: Kenneth Kirk
1938–1944: Leonard Hodgson
1945–1948: Robert Mortimer
1949–1971: V. A. Demant
1972–1980: Peter Baelz
1982–2006: Oliver O'Donovan
2007–2022: Nigel Biggar

References

1842 establishments in England
Lists of people associated with the University of Oxford
Moral and Pastoral Theology, Regius
Moral and Pastoral Theology, Regius
Moral and Pastoral Theology